Gordon W. Ratcliffe (24 Aug 1925 - Dec 1981) was an English professional rugby league footballer who played in the 1940s and 1950s.

Playing career

International honours
Ratcliffe won caps for England while at Wigan in 1947 against Wales, in 1948 and 1949 against France, and in 1951 against Other Nationalities.

He also played for Great Britain while at Wigan in 1947 against New Zealand, and in 2 matches in 1950 against Australia.

Championship final appearances
Ratcliffe played right-, i.e. number 3, in Wigan's 13–4 victory over Huddersfield in the Championship Final during the 1945–46 season at Maine Road, Manchester on Saturday 18 May 1946.

Challenge Cup Final appearances
Ratcliffe played , i.e. number 2, in Wigan's 8-3 victory over Bradford Northern in the 1947–48 Challenge Cup Final during the 1947–48 season at Wembley Stadium, London on Saturday 1 May 1948, in front of a crowd of 91,465.

County Cup Final appearances
Ratcliffe played , i.e. number 2, and scored a try in Wigan's 3-7 defeat by Widnes in the 1945–46 Lancashire County Cup Final during the 1945–46 season at Wilderspool Stadium, Warrington on Saturday 27 October 1945, played , i.e. number 5, in the 9-3 victory over Belle Vue Rangers in the 1946–47 Lancashire Cup Lancashire County Cup Final during the 1946–47 season at Station Road, Swinton, on Saturday 26 October 1946, played right-wing, and scored a try in the 10-7 victory over Belle Vue Rangers in the 1947–48 Lancashire Cup Lancashire County Cup Final during the 1947–48 season at Wilderspool Stadium, on Saturday 1 November 1947, played right-wing, and scored a try in the 14-8 victory over Warrington in the 1948–49 Lancashire Cup Lancashire County Cup Final during the 1948–49 season at Station Road, Swinton, on Saturday 13 November 1948, played right-wing in the 28-5 victory over Warrington in the 1950–51 Lancashire Cup Lancashire County Cup Final during the 1950–51 season at Station Road, Swinton on Saturday 4 November 1950. and played right-wing in the 14-6 victory over Leigh in the 1951–52  Lancashire County Cup Final during the 1951–52 season at Station Road, on Saturday 27 October 1951.

References

External links
Photograph "1948 Challenge Cup Final - Vic Darlison is held by Wigan's Ratcliffe. - Date: 01/05/1948" at rlhp.co.uk
Statistics at wigan.rlfans.com
Wigan's Top 10 Most Lethal Try Scorers: No 8 - Gordon Ratcliffe

1925 births
1981 deaths
England national rugby league team players
English rugby league players
Great Britain national rugby league team players
Place of birth missing
Place of death missing
Rugby league centres
Rugby league wingers
St Helens R.F.C. players
Wigan Warriors players